Eudonia aequalis is a species of moth in the family Crambidae. It is found in Sweden, Finland and Russia.

The wingspan is 19–23 mm.

References

Moths described in 1986
Eudonia
Moths of Europe